Thomas Charles Pernice Jr. (born September 5, 1959) is an American professional golfer who plays on the PGA Tour Champions. He previously played on the PGA Tour, where he won two tournaments. 

Pernice was born in Kansas City, Missouri. He attended UCLA, where his teammates on the golf team included Jay Delsing, Corey Pavin, Steve Pate and Duffy Waldorf. Pernice was a two-time All-American and Pac-10 Player of the Year in 1981. He majored in Economics and graduated in 1982.

Pernice won two PGA Tour events, his first coming in his 213th event. His best finish in a major is T13 at the 1989 U.S. Open. He is an advocate of the Jim Hardy one plane swing.

Pernice turned 50 in September 2009 and played in his first Champions Tour event at the SAS Championship. He became the 15th player to win a Champions Tour event in his debut, winning by 1 stroke over Nick Price and David Frost. In 2009 and 2010, Pernice played sporadically on the PGA Tour, earning conditional status in 2010 and 2011 while also competing on the Champions Tour.

Pernice rejoined the PGA Tour for 2012 after a third place tie at the Children's Miracle Network Classic moved him to 121st on the 2011 money list, after beginning the week as the fifth alternate and ranked 143rd. In his limited time, Pernice also finished 29th on the Champions Tour, earning him full status on both tours for 2012. Pernice earned over $14.9 million on the PGA Tour.

One of Pernice's daughters has Leber's congenital amaurosis, where her corneas did not fully develop.

Professional wins (13)

PGA Tour wins (2)

Other wins (5)
1994 Midwest PGA Championship
1995 Midwest PGA Championship
1996 Midwest PGA Championship
2004 Straight Down Fall Classic (with Ed Cuff Jr.)
2018 TaylorMade Pebble Beach Invitational

PGA Tour Champions wins (6)

PGA Tour Champions playoff record (2–0)

Results in major championships

CUT = missed the half-way cut
"T" = tied

Summary

Most consecutive cuts made – 2 (four times)
Longest streak of top-10s – 0

Results in The Players Championship

CUT = missed the halfway cut
"T" indicates a tie for a place

Results in World Golf Championships

"T" = Tied

See also
1985 PGA Tour Qualifying School graduates
1987 PGA Tour Qualifying School graduates
1996 PGA Tour Qualifying School graduates
1997 PGA Tour Qualifying School graduates

References

External links

American male golfers
UCLA Bruins men's golfers
PGA Tour golfers
PGA Tour Champions golfers
Golfers from Missouri
Golfers from California
Sportspeople from Kansas City, Missouri
Sportspeople from Nashville, Tennessee
People from Murrieta, California
1959 births
Living people